This is a list of Australian television events and premieres which occurred, or are scheduled to occur, in 2010. The year 2010 will be the 55th year of continuous operation of television in Australia.

Events
 25 January – Sunrise launches its new analogue-styled on-air package, which is used until January 2016.
 8 February – Seven News launches its new look in Sydney, Brisbane and Perth. Seven News has a block mark which carries the big red 7 with the word "NEWS" written on it – these are still unchanged to this indefinite date.
 9 February – The Circle begins broadcasting on Network Ten. The program is joined by Denise Drysdale, Chrissie Swan, Yumi Stynes and Gorgi Coghlan  broadcasts live between 10 am and 12 pm. As a result, Ten's Morning Newshour is moved to 9 am weekdays.
 15 February – Seven News launches its new look in Melbourne and Adelaide.
 19 February – Weekend Sunrise begins airing on Saturdays.
 2 March – Nine's Mornings with Kerri-Anne relaunches as Kerri-Anne, then begins airing on Saturdays with highlights during the week.
 27–30 March – Hey Dad sexual abuse scandal (the sitcom previously screened on the Seven Network) takes place on Channel Nine's A Current Affair. ACA suddenly launched its new graphics on the Monday the story happened.
 14 April – Hey Hey It's Saturday launches on Channel Nine. It also starts 2010 without Ian "Molly" Meldrum, as he is contracted to the Seven Network and Foxtel.
 2 May – Long-time Home and Away star Ray Meagher wins the 2010 TV Week Gold Logie.
 2 June – Leanne Benbow becomes the third person (and the first woman ever to do so) to win the top prize of $200,000 on Deal or No Deal.
 14 June – Paul Wolfenden becomes the third person to miss the final question on Millionaire Hot Seat.
 15 June – Dance troupe Justice Crew win the fourth season of Australia's Got Talent.
 24 June – The Seven Network announces they failed to complete negotiations with Metro-Goldwyn-Mayer for a new carriage deal for their films, and would ultimately replace it with another film studio once Seven's carriage deal with MGM had expired.
 30 June – Analogue television broadcasts are switched off in the Mildura/Sunraysia area, becoming the first region in Australia to do so.
 2 July – Nightline is axed by Nine Network for the second time since 2008, with presenter Kellie Connolly (now Kellie Sloane) being suspended from the network the same day.
 16 July – After over 40 years, Nine drops its coverage of Wimbledon, citing declining ratings. Seven subsequently picks up the rights.
 22 July – ABC News 24 launches. The same day, ABC News launches its graphics, which are still in use to today.
 25 July – 31-year-old Adam Liaw wins the second series of MasterChef Australia, beating 20-year-old Callum Hann, with the Grand Final recorded the ratings over 3.5 million people tuning in.
 27 August – The six-thousandth episode of Australian soap opera Neighbours premieres to 512,000 viewers.
 29 August – The DIY section presenter from Better Homes and Gardens Rob Palmer and his partner Alana Patience win the tenth season of Dancing with the Stars.
 25 September – The Seven Network launches its new HD digital multichannel 7mate, replacing Seven HD, the first program broadcast was the drawn 2010 AFL Grand Final, on the same timeslot 7TWO relaunches format as a 'Best-of-British'-focused multichannel targeting people over 55.
 26 September – The Nine Network launches its new HD digital multichannel GEM after failing to soft-launch two days earlier because of technical issues. Their on-air presentation and package are used until the on air theme relaunch in late 2015.
 28 September – 17-year-old Amanda Ware wins the sixth cycle of Australia's Next Top Model, beating 19-year-old Kelsey Martinovich after Martinovich was initially announced the wrong winner by host and supermodel Sarah Murdoch.
 8 October – Hi-5 celebrates its 500th episode.
 28 October – Seven announces they will have a carriage output deal with Sony Pictures for channels 7TWO & 7mate, replacing Metro-Goldwyn-Mayer's carriage contract.
 15 November – 12-year-old Queenslander, Isabella wins the first season of Junior MasterChef Australia
 22 November – Altiyan Childs wins the second series of The X Factor.
 30 November – Michael Venus resigns as news director of Nine News Melbourne.

Celebrity Deaths

Channels

New channels
 2010 – STVDIO
 1 May 2010 – MTV Classic (replaced VH1)
 10 June 2010 – Ten West (Regional Western Australia)
 22 July 2010 – ABC News 24 (replaced ABC HD)
 25 September 2010 – 7mate (replaces Seven HD)
 26 September 2010 – GEM (replaces Nine HD)
 1 November 2010 – Speed (HD)
 1 November 2010 – MTV Hits
 1 November 2010 – MTVN Live (HD)
 1 November 2010 – BBC Knowledge HD
 1 November 2010 – National Geographic Wild (HD)
 1 November 2010 – Foxtel 3D

Shutdown channels
 1 May 2010 – VH1 (replaced by MTV Classic)
 2010 – Ovation (replaced by STVDIO)
 22 July 2010 – ABC HD (replaced by ABC News 24)
 25 September 2010 – Seven HD (replaced by 7mate)
 26 September 2010 – Nine HD (replaced by GEM)
 15 December 2010 – One SD

Ratings

Premieres

Domestic series

International series

Specialty programmes

Domestic

International

Programming changes

Changes to network affiliation
This is a list of programs which made their premiere on an Australian television network that had previously premiered on another Australian television network. The networks involved in the switch of allegiances are predominantly both free-to-air networks or both subscription television networks. Programs that have their free-to-air/subscription television premiere, after previously premiering on the opposite platform (free-to air to subscription/subscription to free-to air) are not included. In some cases, programs may still air on the original television network. This occurs predominantly with programs shared between subscription television networks.

Domestic

International

Free-to-air premieres
This is a list of programs which made their premiere on Australian free-to-air television that had previously premiered on Australian subscription television. Programs may still air on the original subscription television network.

International

Subscription premieres
This is a list of programs which made their premiere on Australian subscription television that had previously premiered on Australian free-to-air television. Programs may still air on the original free-to-air television network.

Domestic

International

Ending this year

Returning this year

See also
 2010 in Australia
 List of Australian films of 2010

Notes

References